Kenneth Herdigein (born June 12, 1959 in Paramaribo) is a Dutch actor of Surinamese descent, best known as a television actor in popular Dutch comedy-dramas.

Career
Herdigein first gained popularity as a television actor in the 1980s, in such shows as Opzoek naar Yolanda (1984), We zijn weer thuis (1989-1994), and Zeg 'ns Aaa (1988-1993).

Herdigein has also performed in musicals, such as Amandla! Mandela, 2009 in which he played Nelson Mandela, and has directed for the stage, such as Adio...mijn liefste (1995), in which he also performed, and Ons Kent Ons (2011), a cabaret-musical dealing with the Dutch history of slavery performed in the Tropenmuseum.

In 2005 he was given the Cosmic Award (by Job Cohen) at the annual Hollandse Nieuwe theater festival in Amsterdam; the award is given to the best Dutch artist of non-Dutch descent.

Selected filmography

Television
Opzoek naar Yolanda (1984)
We zijn weer thuis (1989-1994)
Zeg 'ns Aaa (1988-1993)
12 steden, 13 ongelukken (1997)
Baantjer (1998-1999)
Flikken Maastricht (2007)
Keyzer & De Boer Advocaten (2005-2008)
Spangas (2008-2011)
Goede tijden, slechte tijden (2006-2018)

Musicals
Amandla! Mandela (2009)
Ons kent ons (2011)

Stage
Adio...mijn liefste (1995)

References

External links

1959 births
Living people
20th-century Dutch male actors
21st-century Dutch male actors
Dutch male film actors
Surinamese emigrants to the Netherlands
Dutch male television actors
People from Paramaribo